Tomás Carbonell and Francisco Roig were the defending champions but lost in the final 6–2, 5–7, 6–4 against Libor Pimek and Byron Talbot.

Seeds
Champion seeds are indicated in bold text while text in italics indicates the round in which those seeds were eliminated. All eight seeded teams received byes into the second round.

Draw

Final

Top half

Bottom half

References

Doubles 1996
Mercedes Cup Doubles